Warlock Records is a record label based in New York City that was founded in 1985 by Adam Levy (born 1962), whose father was record producer Morris Levy. Artists that recorded for Warlock Records include Jungle Brothers, Royal House, Skinny Boys, C-Bo, Esham, Tuff Crew, Blac Haze, Juvenile, Half a Mill, Poison Clan, The Last Mr. Bigg, and Kim Waters.

In the 1990s Warlock Records acquired the labels Sleeping Bag Records, Fresh Records, Streetwise Records/Party Time, Ligosa Records, Quality Records USA, Dangerous Records, Pump, N-Coded Music, N2K, Strictly Hype, Underground Construction, High Power Records, Aureus, and Cheetah Records.

In September 2009, Warlock Records and all of its acquired labels were sold to Phase One Network, a music-asset management company that now controls over 20 labels in the pop, hip hop, dance, jazz, and R&B genres. These recordings are licensed to Traffic Entertainment for physical distribution.

Phase One Network, has licensed songs to various television shows, commercials, video games, and movies including the following: 
 Everybody Hates Chris
 Sex and the City
 Entourage
 I Think I Love My Wife
 Grand Theft Auto 3
 Hot Chick
 DJ Hero

References

American independent record labels
Hip hop record labels
Electronic dance music record labels